Nicholas Anthony "Tony" Geiss (November 16, 1924 – January 21, 2011) was an American producer, screenwriter, songwriter and author, known principally for his children's work.

Biography

Geiss was born in The Bronx to Alexander Geiss and Marjore Thirer.  Geiss was a staff writer and songwriter for Sesame Street - he wrote Don't Eat the Pictures (1983) - and was a writer for The Land Before Time (1988) and the associated book. He was also a producer and writer for the Don Bluth film An American Tail (1986).

Geiss died at the age of 86 on January 21, 2011, from complications after a fall at his home in Manhattan, New York.

External links

Archive of American Television interview with Tony Geiss
Tony Geiss Papers. General Collection, Beinecke Rare Book and Manuscript Library, Yale University.

1924 births
2011 deaths
Accidental deaths in New York (state)
Accidental deaths from falls
Sesame Street crew
American television writers
American television producers
American lyricists
American male screenwriters
American children's writers
American film producers
American male television writers
Cornell University alumni